The Baltic Assembly Prize for Literature, the Arts and Science is an award given annually by the Baltic Assembly for achievements in three categories: literature, art and science.

The prize is an annual award given to a citizen of Estonia, Latvia or Lithuania "for outstanding achievements" in three categories: literature, art and science. It was awarded for the first time in 1994 and consists of a statuette, a diploma and a sum of money, presently (2016) 5,000 euro. It is awarded during the formal session of the assembly. A joint jury consisting of three persons per prize make the decision on whom to award the prize. The purpose of the award is according to the Baltic Assembly to "demonstrate the common interests of the countries in this region in upholding of their national identity and self-esteem; create an opportunity to learn about the achievements of the neighbouring countries; maintain a continuous interest among the people in Estonia, Latvia and Lithuania about developments in the Baltic States; strengthen cooperation among the Baltic States in the fields of literature, the arts and science; encourage more and more people to become interested in the intellectual values and languages of the Baltic nations; and raise the level of literature, the arts and science in the Baltic States."

List of recipients of the Baltic Assembly Prize for Literature
The following list is based on the official webpage of the Baltic Assembly.

List of recipients of the Baltic Assembly Prize for the Arts
The following list is based on the official webpage of the Baltic Assembly.

List of recipients of the Baltic Assembly Prize for Science
The following list is based on the official webpage of the Baltic Assembly.

See also 
List of European art awards

References

Awards established in 1993
Science and technology awards
European literary awards
Visual arts awards
Baltic states